Vassilis Makris (born 1958) is a Greek photographer.

Life and work
Makris was born in Patras, Greece. He started working as a professional photographer in 1985, initially focusing on stage photography. In 1987, he visited New York City and photographed various museums and historical buildings. Drawn by the subject, he switched his specialization to architectural photography and in 1989, started shooting private residences and interior spaces in Los Angeles, USA. It was then that he launched his long-term association with Greek and international publishing organizations. 
During this period he also photographed concerts by Vangelis in Athens, Paris, Rome and Rotterdam at the artist’s request.

2002 saw the publishing of his first coffee table photo book "Houses in Greece - Under the sun" (Σπίτια στην Ελλάδα - Κάτω απ’ τον ήλιο) a collection of interiors from private residences throughout Greece. The following year he published the photo album "The Face of Athens" (Το πρόσωπο της Αθήνας), a photographic and architectural record of the city of Athens, in cooperation with journalist Nikos Vatopoulos.

In 2009, he represented Greece at FotoWeek DC (Washington DC, USA) with his participation in the ‘What Lies Beneath: Nature and Urban Landscape in EU Photography’ exhibition, along with 19 other photographers from Europe.

From 2005 to 2010, he taught various courses on the principles of architectural and industrial photography at the Leica Academy of Creative Photography in Athens.

Between 2010 and 2012, he was a member of the editorial team, chief photo editor and photo content manager of the op-ed web site protagon.gr.

He has been a member of the Greek Union of Film, Television and Audiovisual Technicians (ΕΤΕΚΤ-ΟΤ) since 1988, as a Still Photographer, and of PHOEBUS, the Greek Organization for the Collective Management and Protection of the Intellectual Property Rights of Photographers.

In 2011 he started working closely with the Onassis Cultural Centre – Athens, a new cultural space hosting events and actions across the spectrum of the arts, as well as the National Theater of Greece and the National Opera of Greece, photographing show rehearsals and performances, in support of the arts and culture of a nation in crisis.

In June 2015 he participated in the 4-day “Light Up the Night” event at the Stavros Niarchos Park with a one-man show, presenting 16 photographs from the “Incarnation” project, a work in progress that was completed in 2017 on the central stage of the opera house at the Stavros Niarchos Foundation Cultural Center. 

In May 2016 he mounted the "Damni i colori...The making of" exhibition at the visitors center of the Stavros Niarchos Foundation Cultural Center (SNFCC). The photographs depict the preparatory stages of Isma Toulatou's  “Opera and Fashion” project, offering the public an opportunity to vicariously experience and take part in the rehearsals and backstage action of the project, which was presented on May 19, 2016 at the Greek National Opera’s Olympia Theater.

In 2017, while continuing to pursue his professional career, he returned to the Leica Akademie Greece, where he currently teaches architectural and industrial photography and leads workshops and masterclasses organized by the Akademie.

Publications
Σπίτια στην Ελλάδα - Κάτω απ’ τον ήλιο = Houses in Greece - Under the Sun. Potamos, 2002. .
Το πρόσωπο της Αθήνας = The Face of Athens. Potamos, 2003. . With Nikos Vatopoulos.
English edition, 2004.
Second edition, 2008.
Εισαγωγή στην αρχιτεκτονική φωτογραφία = Introduction to Architectural Photography. Leica Akademie Greece, 2021. .

References

''The first version of the article is translated and based on the article at the Greek Wikipedia (el:Main Page)

External links
Makris's website
Polaroid Portfolios of Vassilis Makris

Cretan production of the album Kato apo ton Ilio (Under the Sun), by Tonia Makra (Τόνια Μάκρα), TO BHMA Newspaper, Jan. 2003
Cretan production of the album To prosopo tis Athinas (The Face of Athens), by Angelos Delivorias (Άγγελος Δεληβοριάς), TO BHMA Newspaper, Apr. 2003
BlueMagazine - of Aegean Airlines - Issue #57 - Jan. 2016 features Vassilis Makris’ ongoing photography project titled 'Incarnation' (p. 100-117)

1958 births
Living people
Artists from Patras
Greek photographers